Weapon is an EP by Six Finger Satellite, released in 1991 through Sub Pop.

Track listing

Personnel 
Six Finger Satellite
Chris Dixon – bass guitar
John MacLean – guitar
Richard D. Pelletier – drums
Peter Phillips – guitar, additional vocals
Jeremiah Ryan – vocals
Additional musicians and production
Tim O'Heir – production
Six Finger Satellite – production

References

External links 
 

1991 EPs
Six Finger Satellite albums
Sub Pop EPs